Frank Wright (1932 – August 9, 2020) was an American painter, professor of art for many years at George Washington University, and sixth-generation Washingtonian.

Early life and education 
Wright was born in Washington, D.C. He attended DC Public Schools graduating from Eastern High School in 1950. From there, he attended American University on a scholarship from the National Society of Arts and Letters and received his BA, in 1954.  He then went on to do studies and research at the Berenson Villa I Tatti in Florence, (1956-1958) and post-graduate work at the Fogg Museum at Harvard University (1960-1961).  The study he undertook at Bernard Berenson's Tuscan residence was on the relationship of Florentine painting to the Florentine theatre in the Quattrocento. He received his master's degree in Art-History from the University of Illinois.

Career 
As a painter, Wright's work has been exhibited widely. His work was the subject of a solo exhibition, "Frank Wright: Paintings, Prints, Drawings" at Adams, Davidson Galleries, Washington, DC, which ran from May 6 until June 7, 1975, and of several solo exhibitions at the Kennedy Gallery also in WDC.  He had a solo museum exhibition entitled "Frank Wright: Paintings 1968-1980" at the Corcoran Gallery of Art, in Washington, DC, which was on display from  June 13 until July 19, 1981. From 1970-2015, he was a professor of art at George Washington University, where his students included the noted painter, sculptor, and draughtsman Robert Liberace who credits Wright with having instilled into him a love of the old masters. In his career, he produced 220 pieces of Art.

Personal life 
He married Mary Dow Wright and they have a daughter Suzanne Wright. He died on August 9, 2020.

References

1932 births
2020 deaths
American male painters
George Washington University faculty
American University alumni
Painters from Washington, D.C.
20th-century American painters
20th-century male artists
21st-century American painters
21st-century male artists
 Eastern High School (Washington, D.C.) alumni